Sepe Elye Wahi (born 2 January 2003) is a French professional footballer who plays as a forward for  club Montpellier.

Club career
While a youth player at Caen, Wahi made headlines for scoring 89 goals in the 2016–17 season as an under-14 and under-15 player.

On 17 October 2019, Wahi signed his first professional contract with Montpellier. He made his professional debut in a 2–0 Ligue 1 loss to Metz on 16 December 2020.

Wahi scored his first goal for Montpellier in a 3–2 loss to Monaco on 15 January 2021. In doing so, he became the club's second-youngest ever goal scorer at the age of 18 years and 13 days. On 14 March 2022, Wahi signed a contract extension at Montpellier. On 29 December 2022, by scoring his twentieth career Ligue 1 goal in a 2–0 away win over Lorient, Wahi became only the second teenager after Kylian Mbappé to reach this milestone in the previous forty years.

International career
Born in France, Wahi is of Ivorian descent. He is a youth international for France.

Career statistics

Controversy 
In October 2021, a 22-year old woman filed a legal complaint against Wahi for violence that resulted in her being incapable to work. She claimed that he had punched her in the nose during an evening out at the L'Entrepôt nightclub in Lattes, Hérault, in the night of 12–13 September a month earlier. The woman received treatment from emergency services due to the violence.

In November 2021, it was revealed by investigative reporter Romain Molina that Wahi had been expelled from Caen's youth academy for allegedly pressuring secondary school students to masturbate in front of him in the bathrooms.

References

External links
 
 
 
 

2003 births
Living people
Footballers from Essonne
Association football forwards
French footballers
France youth international footballers
French sportspeople of Ivorian descent
Montpellier HSC players
Ligue 1 players
Championnat National 2 players
Championnat National 3 players
People from Évry, Essonne